Neolamprologus pleuromaculatus is a species of cichlid endemic to Lake Tanganyika where it is only known to occur in the northern half of the lake.  This species can reach a length of  TL.  It can also be found in the aquarium trade.

References

pleuromaculatus
Taxa named by Max Poll
Taxa named by Ethelwynn Trewavas
Fish described in 1952
Taxonomy articles created by Polbot